The Celebration may refer to:

The Celebration, (Danish: Festen) a 1998 Danish film directed by Thomas Vinterberg
Festen (play), the stage adaptation of the above film
The Celebration (novel), a 1976 Brazilian novel by Ivan Ângelo